The 1937–38 Western Kentucky State Teachers Hilltoppers men's basketball team represented Western Kentucky State Normal School and Teachers College (now known as Western Kentucky University) during the 1937-38 NCAA basketball season. The team was led by future Naismith Memorial Basketball Hall of Fame coach Edgar Diddle and the school's first player recognized as an All-American, William “Red” McCrocklin. The Hilltoppers won the Kentucky Intercollegiate Athletic Conference and Southern Intercollegiate Athletic Association championships, were the first NCAA team to win 30 games in a season, and received an invitation to the 1938 National Intercollegiate Basketball tournament; however, the team was unable to make the trip and withdrew from the tournament.  The NAIA lists the game as a forfeit, but Western Kentucky does not officially recognize the contest.  Ralph Dudgeon, Harry Saddlerand, and McCrocklin were selected to the All-SIAA and All-KIAC teams.

Schedule

|-
!colspan=6| Regular season

|-

 

|-
!colspan=6| 1938 Kentucky Intercollegiate Athletic Conference tournament

|-
!colspan=6| 1938 Southern Intercollegiate Athletic Association Tournament

|-
!colspan=6| 1938 National Intercollegiate Basketball tournament

Western Kentucky does not recognize the NIBT game as part of their official records

References

Western Kentucky Hilltoppers basketball seasons
Western Kentucky State Teachers